Lachin (also Romanized as Lāchīn) is a village in Zalu Ab Rural District, in the Central District of Ravansar County, Kermanshah Province, Iran. At the 2006 census, its population was 33, in 7 families.

References 

Populated places in Ravansar County